The Marc Sleen Museum was a museum located in Brussels, Belgium, dedicated to the work of Belgian comics artist Marc Sleen, who is known for his series The Adventures of Nero, Piet Fluwijn en Bolleke and De Lustige Kapoentjes. It was located across the street from the Belgian Comic Strip Center at 33–35, /, and was served by Brussels-Congress railway station and Brussels Central Station. It was founded in 2009.

On 30 January 2023, it was announced that the museum would close down in the autumn, with part of the collection being integrated into the Belgian Comic Strip Center.

History
On 19 June 2009, the Marc Sleen Museum was opened to the public, with the presence of Marc Sleen, as well as King Albert II. The king was a fan of Nero since his youth and both him and his brother King Baudouin learned Dutch by reading Nero.

The museum's location was symbolic, since Marc Sleen started his career as cartoonist in 1947 whilst working for the newspaper De Nieuwe Gids, whose office was located on the Rue des Sables. The original building was erected in Art Nouveau style by the architects Fernand Brunfaut and his son Maxime Brunfaut.

Exhibition
The museum was managed by the Marc Sleen Foundation. It exhibited original art work and memorabilia by Marc Sleen, as well as an overview of his long and versatile career, including his nature documentaries which he made for the Belgian TV show Allemaal Beestjes ("All kinds of animals"). About 15,000 drawings were archived in the cellars and were available for temporary exhibitions.

The museum had a reading corner for children. Comic book albums by Sleen could be bought as well. One specific story, Het Spook uit de Zandstraat ("The Ghost of the ") has been translated into English, French and German, and was made available as a souvenir for tourists. Temporary exhibitions were also organised.

The museum was open every day, from 11 a.m. to 1 p.m. and from 2 p.m. to 6 p.m., except on Mondays.

Marc Sleen Route
The museum organised a special tourists' route in Brussels, based on several locations that appeared in Nero comic book albums, including the Black Tower, Palace of Justice, Chapel Church, Sablon/Zavel, Central Station, Grand-Place/Grote Markt and Manneken Pis. One had to make an appointment, though.

See also
 Brussels' Comic Book Route
 Art Nouveau in Brussels
 Culture of Belgium

Sources

External links

 

Museums in Brussels
City of Brussels
Cartooning museums
Belgian comics
The Adventures of Nero
Art museums and galleries in Belgium
Art museums established in 2009
2009 establishments in Belgium
2023 disestablishments in Belgium